LynNell Hancock is an education reporter and professor.  She graduated from the University of Iowa and the Columbia University Graduate School of Journalism, where she is now a professor.

After graduating from Columbia, Hancock worked as a reporter with the New York Daily News and The Village Voice, mainly covering education and children's issues. A former education editor of Newsweek, Hancock is active in several education and children's organizations.

At Columbia, Hancock teaches education and children's reporting. She is the author of "Hands to Work," a book about the lives of three welfare recipients in New York City.

External links
Columbia Journalism School Official Biography

Year of birth missing (living people)
Living people
American women journalists
Columbia University Graduate School of Journalism alumni
University of Iowa alumni
Writers from New York City
21st-century American women